Balneário Rincão is a municipality in the state of Santa Catarina in the South region of Brazil. The municipality was established in January 2013.

See also
List of municipalities in Santa Catarina

References

Municipalities in Santa Catarina (state)